Walden (Canada 1996 Census population 10,292) was a town in the Canadian province of Ontario, which existed from 1973 to 2000. Created as part of the Regional Municipality of Sudbury when regional government was introduced, the town was dissolved when the city of Greater Sudbury was incorporated on January 1, 2001. The name Walden continues to be informally used to designate the area.

Walden now constitutes most of Ward 2 on Greater Sudbury City Council, and is represented by councillor Michael Vagnini. Walden is part of the federal Sudbury electoral district, represented in the House of Commons of Canada by Paul Lefebvre of the Liberal Party of Canada, and the provincial constituency of Nickel Belt, represented in the Legislative Assembly of Ontario by France Gélinas of the Ontario New Democratic Party.

In the Canada 2011 Census, the areas of Lively, Waters, Mikkola and Naughton were grouped for the first time as the population centre (or urban area) of Lively, with a population of 6,922 and a population density of 350.9/km2. No separate population statistics were published for the more rural western portion of Walden, which was counted only as part of the city's overall census data; however, the individual census tracts corresponding to the former town of Walden had a total population of 10,664. For the Canada 2016 Census, the boundaries of the Lively population centre were revised to exclude Naughton, for a new population of 5,608 and an adjusted 2011 population of 5,584.

History

The town was created by amalgamating the township municipalities of Waters and Drury, Dennison & Graham with the unincorporated geographic townships of Lorne, Louise and Dieppe and parts of the unincorporated townships of Hyman, Trill, Fairbank, Creighton, Snider and Eden. The name "Walden" was chosen as an acronym of Waters, Lively and Denison. Other names were suggested, but the final selection process had narrowed the naming options to Walden or Makada, an Ojibwe name for the town's Black Lake (makade in contemporary spelling).

Tom Davies, who later became chair of the Regional Municipality of Sudbury, was the first mayor of Walden as a town. Later mayors included Charles White, Terry Kett, Alex Fex and Dick Johnstone. Following Davies' retirement as chair of the regional municipality in 1997, Sudbury's city hall was renamed Tom Davies Square in his honour.

Prior to the municipal amalgamation, Walden was the largest town by land area in Canada.

Communities

Lively

The administrative and commercial centre of Walden, Lively was established in the 1950s as a company townsite for employees of INCO's Creighton Mine facilities. It was named for an early settler, Charles Lively. Prior to the community's establishment, a few family farms were located in the area. The most notable of these, the Anderson Farm, is now the Anderson Farm Museum, which showcases aspects of the history of Lively, Creighton, and Waters Township. Lively's postal delivery and telephone exchange also include the Mikkola subdivision, located at the eastern terminus of Highway 17's freeway segment, and the Waters area.

From the intersection of Municipal Roads 24 and 55, Lively refers to the area extending north along MR 24, Mikkola refers to the area extending eastward along MR 55 toward the Highway 17 interchange, and Waters refers to the area extending westward along MR 55 toward Naughton.

Lively was the first area hit by the Sudbury tornado on August 20, 1970.

Lively is also home to the Walden area's branch of the Greater Sudbury Public Library.
Their offices are on Black Lake Road and their second offices are on 9th avenue

Little Creighton
A small residential subdivision just north of Lively, long known as "Dogpatch", officially rebranded itself as Little Creighton in 2015.

Their offices are on the same campus as Jackson's auto repair

Naughton

Naughton was originally established as a point along the Canadian Pacific Railway Algoma Branch and was named McNaughtonville. In 1887, the Hudson's Bay Company relocated its existing trading post from Whitefish Lake to the south, which had been established in 1824, to Naughton, so that it could be closer to the CPR line. The trading post closed in 1896, and during the 1920s and 1930s, many of the original buildings at the trading post site were demolished or burned down, though the store itself survived until at least the 1960s.

Naughton is the birthplace of Boston Bruins legend Art Ross, who was the son of Thomas B. Ross, the trading post's postmaster in 1881. In 1947, Ross donated the NHL trophy bearing his name awarded to the player scoring the most points during the season. Ross was also inducted into the Hockey Hall of Fame in 1945.

Naughton is also home to a number of historical plaques commemorating Salter's Meridian, a survey line which resulted in the first known evidence of the Sudbury area's massive mineral deposits, as well the Hudson's Bay Company's Whitefish Lake Trading Post. Naughton is also home to the Walden Cross Country Ski Club, of which sports the ParaNordic program (an organization that allows children with disabilities to cross-country ski in a familiar environment and race with others of their skill levels.) It was also home to the now-defunct Sparks AC, an affiliate of the Finnish-Canadian Amateur Sports Federation.

The offices are located in the former our lady of Fatima school

Whitefish

Whitefish's postal delivery and telephone exchange also include the community of Den-Lou, which is named for its location straddling the boundaries of the geographic townships of Dennison and Louise, and the Lake Panache area. Currently, the Ontario Ministry of Transportation is undergoing discussion in regards to extending the freeway through Den-Lou. As of 2016, Whitefish had a population of 219 people in 100 households.

Historically, Whitefish was a postal village along the Canadian Pacific Railway's Sudbury-Soo line, which ran parallel to the south of the Algoma Eastern Railway (AER). Its station was situated along the line west of Naughton and east of Victoria Mines, where a junction and spur line connected it to the AER. In 1908, it had a recorded population of 150, and had two stores, two hotels, and telegraph and express offices. Today, the main heritage building in the community is the Penage Hotel, which after its past as a railway hotel, functioned in various capacities as a hair salon, a bar, apartments, and a convenience store.

The community was home to the Whitefish Kipinä AC (later Speed AC), a youth sports club which was an affiliate of the Finnish-Canadian Amateur Sports Federation.

the offices are located east of Whitefish

Beaver Lake

The name "Beaver Lake" refers, generally, to the westernmost end of the former Town of Walden, along Highway 17 in the geographic township of Lorne, west of Whitefish. Like many communities in Northern Ontario, the modern history of Beaver Lake started with the building of the Canadian Pacific Railway through the area in the late 1880s. With the discovery of nickel deposits bringing jobs and settlers to the Sudbury area, Finnish immigrants in particular settled in the Beaver Lake area, south of the CPR line between Sudbury and Sault Ste. Marie, establishing farming homesteads centred around the lake and mostly producing milk as an export. The milk was often shipped by rail to Co-optas (in Copper Cliff) and later the Sudbury Producers and Consumers (P&C) Co-Operative Dairy, both local dairy co-operatives started and mostly operated by Finns and supported by the Finnish dairy farmers in the region. Later, the milk was processed by the Copper Cliff Dairy.

The Beaver Lake farms were hurt financially by the Great Depression and the aging group of original settlers had mostly shut down their working farms by the 1950s, with many of the lots being subdivided and sold off. Nevertheless, many of their descendants continue to live in the area, which is heavily influenced by Finnish culture, though the single-room schoolhouse and general store were both casualties of this community crisis.

The community was also known for its Jehu AC youth athletics club, which was an affiliate of the Finnish-Canadian Amateur Sports Federation (FCASF). Founded in 1921, club members won victories while competing against athletes from Sudbury, Creighton, Timmins, and South Porcupine, as well as many other communities. Jehu AC was known for its dominance in cross-country skiing, a sport which Finnish settlers had brought with them to Canada and which was popularized by Finnish athletics clubs before its general acceptance as a Canadian sport. This was evident as late as 1961, when Beaver Lake athletes won five out of nine cross-country ski events at the Port Arthur (now Thunder Bay) FCASF championship. As the population aged and youth left the community to seek economic opportunities, the club membership began to shrink. Its last event took place in 1969, after which it would sell its sports field to the Beaver Lake Sports and Cultural Club. Today, the club's grounds mark the entry point for the Beaver Lake ski trails, which loop around and exit back at the club.
Their offices are located east of Beaver lake

Worthington

Mining disaster
The Worthington Mine ore body was initially discovered in 1884 by Francis Charles Crean. In 1891, the first mine shaft was sunk, with a small community being incorporated nearby the following year which was named after the Canadian Pacific Railway construction superintendent James Worthington, notable as the person responsible for the naming of Sudbury after his wife's hometown in England. At this time, it was operated by the Dominion Mineral Company with two shafts at depths of 35 and 95 feet. In 1894, however, mining operations at the site were suspended. Development began in 1907 to modernize the mine's equipment, but was suspended in 1909. The troubled mine was acquired by the Mond Nickel Company in 1913 as Mond abandoned its previous operations at Victoria Mines. Mond quickly sank a third shaft to a depth of 200 feet, completed modernization of the mine's equipment, and built several workers' cottages at the site to help house its 110-man workforce. The mine became operational and by 1917 had shipped 172,000 tons of ore, the majority of which was sold to the CPR to be used as track ballast rather than being sent to Mond's Coniston smelter. In 1918, Mond continued its rapid development of the mine by deepening the third shaft to about 750 feet, developing existing mine shaft areas, and expanding its workforce to 220 men, while internally expanding the mine using a shrinkage stoping method. The following year, it upgraded the air compressor on the site with one originally located at the Frood Extension mine. Mond's rapid development of the mine created a pillar of natural rock. As ore was extracted, workers underground observed cracks in this pillar, which Mond addressed with timbers to brace it. Undaunted, Mond continued its plans to deepen the shaft to 1000 feet and continued to extract ore from the upper levels.

On October 3, 1927, abnormal rock shifts were observed and management made the decision to evacuate the 46 day shift workers underground and cancel the night shift. Additionally, the town of Worthington was also evacuated as a precaution. At 5:50 a.m. on October 4, a ground fault gave way, which caused the entire underground portion of the mine to collapse down to its fifth level (the 750-foot level), creating a crater which pulled into itself the mine's power house, a worker's home, and 500 feet of CPR mainline track. With no injuries suffered, the disaster became an overnight sensation which attracted sightseers, and the crater left by the mine quickly filled with water and became an artificial lake. The mine was no longer deemed operational and was abandoned, though some buildings were still left standing including the headframe.

Nearby, the Totten Mine is currently under active operation after its own history of sustained closures and periods of operation, being originally operated from 1915 to 1917 by the Canadian Nickel Company, briefly revived in the 1950s-1960s with Inco exploration work and new shafts being sunk, but developments were abandoned in 1971 and the mine was allowed to flood in 1976. In 2007, Vale Limited began to rehabilitate the existing mine, which was reopened in 2014.

Community

Worthington was established as a community in 1892 and functioned as a basic settlement with 35 dwellings, a company store, a railway station and a post office. By 1910, there were several more establishments including a hotel and social hall. Its population gradually increased to a peak of 400-500 residents after the Mond company purchased the nearby mine and expanded its workforce. After the infamous mining disaster nearby, the original townsite was abandoned and many residents left; however, a new townsite was established in alignment with the highway to the north, and throughout the 1930s and 40s, it primarily functioned as a highway service outlet. In the 1950s, the community had a brief revival due to resumed mining activity at the Kidd-Copper and Totten mines, and the highway nearby was designated Ontario Highway 658 in 1968. However, the community was bypassed to the south by Ontario Highway 17 (forming a component of the Trans-Canada Highway), and Highway 658 was transferred by the province to the Regional Municipality of Sudbury in 1973 upon amalgamation and became Municipal Road 4, also known as Fairbank Lake Road. After this, the focal point of the settlement shifted south to align with Highway 17, bringing it closer to the community of Beaver Lake, and the longtime Worthington post office was relocated to Beaver Lake, though Worthington is still today a valid postal address which includes other communities like Beaver Lake, an indication of its historical status as the primary settlement east of Nairn Centre and west of Whitefish.

Their offices are near Tottem Mine north of beaver lake

Creighton Mine

Creighton Mine, also known as simply Creighton, is located near the intersection of Municipal Road 24 and Highway 144. The community, established in 1900 as an INCO company town, took its name from the geographic township in which it is located, which was named by the province of Ontario in the 1880s for MPP David Creighton.

The town had a population of around 2,200 at its peak in the 1940s, although the population slowly declined after improvements in the area's transportation networks made it easier for workers to live away from the company townsite.

In 1986, the town was closed down. and all of the town's homes and businesses were torn down or moved to Lively. Some residents initially fought the plan, but were not successful in convincing the company to change its plans. Upgrading the town's water, sewer and road systems to contemporary standards would have cost the company over $10 million, a cost which the company deemed to be prohibitive.

A few streets, sidewalks and building foundations can still be found in the area. A monument, shown at right, was also placed in the community.

The historic paymaster's cabin from Creighton was moved to the Anderson Farm Museum where an annual reunion continues to bring former residents and family together to share their memories of their former community.

The mine is also the site of the Sudbury Neutrino Observatory.

Their offices are in Water Tank Hill

High Falls

High Falls is a ghost town located near the junction of the Spanish River with Agnew Lake, at the westernmost boundary of the city.

The town was created in 1904, when a hydroelectric dam and power plant were built on the Spanish River. This power plant, owned and operated by Vale Limited, supplied electric power to many of the area's mining towns, and is still operational today.

The town was closely connected to the nearby community of Turbine. However, in the 1960s, many families began to move away from the community for economic reasons, and by 1975 the community was virtually abandoned. Homes were demolished or relocated, and by the mid-1980s the power plant was the only remaining vestige of the community.

Their offices are located east of Levack and west of Dowling.

Victoria Mines

Victoria Mines is a ghost town. It was established by the Anglo-German chemist and industrialist Ludwig Mond as a company town for his Mond Nickel Company for workers at the smelter that processed ore from his Mond Mine. A separate townsite of Mond was established at the mine itself, and the two communities are sometimes referred to as a single settlement known variously as Mond or Victoria Mines.

Operations at the mine began in 1899 and were in full swing by 1901. Meanwhile, a smelter had been built two miles to the south of the mine, on the Canadian Pacific Railway's Sault Ste. Marie branch, which processed ore from the nearby mine site as well as from the Garson and Worthington mines. Production at the smelter initially employed 20 men, using steam power; by 1911, the workforce had grown to 200 men. In 1909, the smelter was connected to the Lorne Falls power plant and switched to electric power, leading to more than a doubling in ore capacity. Additional power arrived in 1916 from the Nairn Falls hydroelectric plant.

In these early years, the town, which was laid out to the north of the CPR line, grew rapidly, receiving a post office in 1900, a CPR passenger station in 1904 (enlarged in 1908), and an assortment of businesses and services, which included a butcher shop, barbershop, dry goods and grocery retailers, a bowling alley, a Roman Catholic church, a Presbyterian church, and public and separate schools. Housing at the town included an apartment building, three boarding houses, and fifty single dwellings, which housed anywhere from 300 to 600 people in its heyday. During this time, the CPR built a spur line along the 3 km distance to the mine site itself. Ethnic groups at Mond included Finns, Ukrainians, Poles, Italians, French, and British, and Victoria Mines had a small "Italian town".

Starting in the early 1910s, Mond Nickel had begun to expand its operations around the Sudbury area, and the Garson mine's output had outstripped the original Mond Mine's production. Mond opened a new smelter in Coniston in 1913, which was closer to the other company-owned mines, as well as having a better connection to the CPR's new Toronto-to-Sudbury line. In the same year, the Victoria Mines smelter was closed. Many buildings were dismantled and moved by rail to Coniston or Worthington (itself now another ghost town), including the Anglican and Presbyterian churches which today still stand in Coniston. The public school was closed in 1914 and children of the remaining inhabitants were forced to walk 4.2 kilometers to the Mond public school, which remained open as the mine there was still active. During this time, all of the smelter workers relocated to Coniston, leaving behind only a hundred or so residents.

The townsite continued to be inhabited by a number of people for decades, ironically surviving longer than its twin town of Mond, which became a ghost town when the mine was closed a decade later in 1923, with the last house being removed in 1936. During its lifetime, the mine produced almost 620,000 tons of ore. A few buildings survived on the site well into the 1950s, but by the 1980s there were only three structures remaining, which were two company-built houses and the separate school. As of 2017, only one structure remains standing, a two-storey company house.

In 2002, mineral rights in the area were acquired by FNX, which merged with Quadra in 2011 to form Quadra FNX Mining. Quadra FNX was in turn acquired by Polish conglomerate KGHM Polska Miedź in 2011, which inherited the claims. Construction was slated to begin on a new mine by 2015 with operations to begin in 2019, but KGHM slowed down its development at the site due to depressed metal prices. As of early 2019, the project was still at pre-environmental assessment stage.

Victoria Mines is the birthplace of Hockey Hall of Famer Hector "Toe" Blake, though he grew up largely in Coniston.

Transportation
Some of Walden's various communities are served by GOVA's 101 Lively bus, which departs Naughton Community Centre for the downtown Sudbury transit terminal approximately every 2 hours, though there is more frequent service on weekday mornings. Along the way, it stops throughout Lively, Copper Cliff, and the west end of Sudbury, before terminating at the South End transit hub. As of 2019, there is no local bus service to the communities further to the west, such as Whitefish and Beaver Lake; however, GOVA also operates an auxiliary taxi service which covers as far as Whitefish.

No intercity transit is available in the Walden area despite most of its communities being situated along the Trans-Canada Highway. The closest intercity transit to the area is in downtown Sudbury, or alternatively an Ontario Northland flag stop in Nairn Centre.

Education
Those in the English catholic stream attend St-James and St-Benedict. Those in the English public stream attend Walden Public school, Lively secondary school, and RH Murray for Whitefish. Those in the French public stream attend Helene Gravel and Macdonald Cartier. Those in the French catholic stream attend St-Paul and Sacré Coeur.

Media
Walden is served by a monthly newspaper, Walden Today, which started in May 2011, and was formerly served by a weekly community newspaper, the Walden Observer, which is no longer in production.

Walden is otherwise served by citywide media, although its proximity to the North Shore region means that residents of Whitefish, Beaver Lake and Worthington also have access to several radio stations, including CJJM-FM in Espanola, CFRM-FM in Little Current and CKNR-FM in Elliot Lake, whose signals do not reach the main urban core of Sudbury, as well as Espanola-area rebroadcasters of Sudbury's CBCS-FM and CBON-FM.

Notable people
Toe Blake was inducted into the Hockey Hall of Fame as a coach and player.
Troy Crowder, drafted to the NHL in 1996, playing for the New Jersey Devils, Detroit Red Wings, Los Angeles Kings, and Vancouver Canucks from 1987–88 to 1996–97.
Bud Cullen, former Canadian Federal Judge and former MP for Sarnia-Lambton, was born in Creighton Mine, ON.
Andrew Desjardins, drafted as a free agent in 2010 by the San Jose Sharks, currently playing for the Chicago Blackhawks.
Meagan Duhamel, Canadian pairs figure skater, Olympic Gold Medalist-2018 
France Gélinas, the current Member of Provincial Parliament for Nickel Belt, is a resident of Naughton.
Bud Germa, former MPP for Sudbury.

References

Further reading
  Contains extensive coverage of the mining and transportation development of some of Walden's communities.

External links
Walden Community Action Network
History of Walden at Greater Sudbury Heritage Museums

Neighbourhoods in Greater Sudbury
Former towns in Ontario
Populated places established in 1973
Hudson's Bay Company trading posts
Populated places disestablished in 2000